Teragra is a genus of moths in the family Cossidae.

Species
 Teragra althodes Hampson, 1920
 Teragra angulifascia Gaede, 1929
 Teragra cammae Lehmann, 2007
 Teragra clarior Gaede, 1929
 Teragra conspersa Walker, 1855
 Teragra guttifera Hampson, 1910
 Teragra insignifica Gaede, 1929
 Teragra irvingi Janse, 1925
 Teragra lemairei Rougeot, 1977
 Teragra macroptera Mey, 2011
 Teragra ochreisticta Gaede, 1929
 Teragra orphnina Hering, 1932
 Teragra punctana Mey, 2011
 Teragra quadrangula Gaede, 1929
 Teragra simplicius Le Cerf
 Teragra trimaculata Gaede, 1929
 Teragra tristicha Hampson, 1920
 Teragra umbrifera Hampson, 1910
 Teragra villiersi Rougeot, 1977
 Teragra vogti Bethune-Baker, 1927

Former species
 Teragra basiplaga Gaede, 1929
 Teragra fuscoradiata Gaede, 1929
 Teragra leucostigma Hampson, 1910
 Teragra neurosticta Hampson, 1910
 Teragra ochreicosta Gaede, 1929
 Teragra simillima Hampson, 1910
 Teragra sticticosta Hampson, 1910

References

External links
Natural History Museum Lepidoptera generic names catalog

Metarbelinae